The Geely Kandi K12 is a microcar produced by the Chinese manufacturer Kandi Technologies.

History 
The K12 microcar went on sale in 2016 as the smallest model in the offer, maintaining an avant-garde design distinguished by numerous, multi-shaped arches and a single body.

Sale
The K12 went on sale only on the Chinese market in May 2017, remaining there for the next 2 years and was cancelled without a successor in the first half of 2018.

Technical data
The electrical system of the Kandi K12 has identical parameters compared to the larger K10 model. It is created by a battery with a capacity of 20 kWh, which, together with the electric motor, provides 47 hp and a range on a single charge of 153 kilometers.

References 

2010s cars
Cars introduced in 2016
Production electric cars
Microcars
Front-wheel-drive vehicles
K12